Rauma sub-region  is a subdivision of Satakunta and one of the Sub-regions of Finland since 2009.

Municipalities
 Eura
 Eurajoki
 Rauma
 Säkylä

Politics
Results of the 2018 Finnish presidential election:

 Sauli Niinistö   66.2%
 Laura Huhtasaari   7.7%
 Pekka Haavisto   7.3%
 Paavo Väyrynen   5.9%
 Matti Vanhanen   5.0%
 Tuula Haatainen   5.0%
 Merja Kyllönen   2.6%
 Nils Torvalds   0.3%

Sub-regions of Finland
Geography of Satakunta